Kielholz is a surname. Notable people with the surname include:

Leopold Kielholz (1911–1980),  Swiss footballer
Walter Kielholz (born 1951), Swiss businessman
Paul Kielholz (born 1916), Swiss psychiatrist

German-language surnames
Swiss-German surnames